The Test was a feature greyhound competition inaugurated at Walthamstow in 1941.

The race was originally raced over a stayers distance before increasing to a marathon distance.

It then reverted to its original distance in 1979. The race came to an end following the closure of Walthamstow in 2008. Winners included the legendary Ballyregan Bob.

Past winners

Venue and distances
1945–1968 (Walthamstow 700 yards)
1969–1974 (Walthamstow 880 yards)
1975–1977 (Walthamstow 820 metres)
1976 & 1978 (Not run)
1979–2008 (Walthamstow 640 metres)
Discontinued

Sponsors
1984-1984 E Coomes Bookmakers
1994-1995 Carling Black Label
2001-2005 Stuart Lambert Bookmakers
2006-2006 William Hill Casino
2007-2008 The Duffy Group Ltd

References

Greyhound racing competitions in the United Kingdom
Recurring sporting events established in 1941
Recurring events disestablished in 2008
Sport in the London Borough of Waltham Forest
Greyhound racing in London